Setzer Goes Instru-Mental! is a music album by Brian Setzer, released in April 2011 through Surfdog Records. The album earned Setzer a Grammy Award nomination for Best Pop Instrumental Album in 2012. Brian Setzer produced, with Callicore Studio, an animated video, illustrating the song "Go-go Godzilla".

Track listing

Personnel
Brian Setzer - guitar
John Hatton - double bass
Noah Levy - drums

References

2011 albums
Albums produced by Dave Darling
Brian Setzer albums
Surfdog Records albums